Pseudochromis howsoni, the Howson's dottyback, is a species of ray-finned fish from the Eastern Indian Ocean around Australia, which is a member of the family Pseudochromidae.

Etymology
The fish is named in honor of Craig Howson, the captain of the charter vessel True North.

References

howsoni
Taxa named by Gerald R. Allen
Fish described in 1995